Sant'Olcese is a comune (municipality) in the Metropolitan City of Genoa in the Italian region of Liguria, located about  north of Genoa.

The municipality of Sant'Olcese contains the frazioni (subdivisions, mainly villages and hamlets) Manesseno, Comago, Arvigo, Torrazza, Casanova, Trensasco, Piccarello, and Vicomorasso.

At Comago, the Comune holds the Park & c. 1850 Victorian English country house, the Villa Serra.

This house, built by the Marquis F. Orso Serra, an Anglophile,  is one of very few Victorian period English country house designs to be found in Italy.  The Park is a member of the Great Gardens of Italy Foundation (Grandi Giardini Italiani)  and is open to the public.

Sant'Olcese borders the following municipalities: Genoa, Montoggio, Serra Riccò.

Demographic evolution

Twin towns — sister cities
Sant'Olcese is twinned with:

  Martorelles, Spain (2002)

References

External links
 www.comune.santolcese.ge.it

Cities and towns in Liguria